South Heart rail terminal is to be built five miles (8 km) west of South Heart, North Dakota by Watco and the Great Northern Project Development. It is to support the Bakken oil and gas industry. Work on the terminal is due to start in the first quarter of 2014, with completion expected next year. The terminal will include freight handling and wagon maintenance facilities, the former operated by Watco. It will be connected to the existing BNSF network, which will also operate the trains.

References

Buildings and structures in Stark County, North Dakota
Railway buildings and structures in North Dakota